Percy Rodriguez (born Percy Rodrigues; June 13, 1918 – September 6, 2007) was a Canadian actor who appeared in many television shows and films from the 1950s to the 1980s. He was of Afro-Portuguese heritage and was born in the Saint-Henri neighbourhood of Montreal. Born with the surname "Rodrigues," he adopted the spelling "Rodriguez" after it was misspelled in a Broadway program early in his career. Rodriguez was also known for his extensive voiceover work as the narrator of film trailers, television spots and documentaries.

Early life
Rodriguez was the oldest of three siblings and was of African and Portuguese descent. After his father left home while Percy was in his early teens, Percy began working to help provide for his family. He developed an interest in boxing and acting, becoming a professional boxer while simultaneously exploring acting jobs. He ended up joining Montreal’s Negro Theatre Guild and ultimately won the Canadian Drama Festival acting award in 1939. Despite the award, finding a legitimate acting job was difficult, which led to him working as a toolmaker and machinist for 10 years at Pratt & Whitney in Longueuil, Quebec in order to survive.

Career
Rodriguez began his acting career in the 1930s, appearing in stage plays and television series in his native country. He eventually moved to New York City, where he made his Broadway theatre debut in Lillian Hellman's Toys in the Attic in 1960. Appearing next in The Actors Studio Theatre production of James Baldwin's Blues for Mister Charlie  (and, shortly thereafter, in an abbreviated television adaptation on CBS), Rodriguez subsequently became a life member of the Studio.

Known for his rich and distinctive voice, Rodriguez became one of the few black actors in the 1960s who were able to circumvent restrictive and negative stereotypes. He managed to avoid the stereotypical roles given to black actors at the time and was known for applying and projecting quiet authority and inner calm during his roles, as well as for the touch of grey in his hair. He went on to star on American television in programs such as The Nurses, Naked City, The Wild Wild West, Route 66 and Star Trek but first gained widespread notoriety in 1968 for his role as neurosurgeon Dr. Harry Miles in the prime time soap opera Peyton Place, seen as a breakthrough white-collar role for a black actor. He also appeared in the made-for-television films The Old Man Who Cried Wolf (1970), Ring of Passion (1978), Angel Dusted (1981), and the miniseries Roots: The Next Generations (1979). Through his depictions on television, Percy was seen as an excellent supporting character actor.

Rodriguez also had an extensive career on the stage and worked with several prominent African-American actors, such as Al Freeman Jr., Brock Peters, Moses Gunn, William Marshall, Raymond St. Jacques, Lincoln Kilpatrick, Rosetta LeNoire, Otis Young and Tony nominee Diana Sands. He also narrated numerous film trailers, TV spots and documentaries throughout his career, continuing to do voiceovers after retiring from acting in 1987, following his final on-camera role as a doctor in the TV movie Perry Mason: The Case of the Sinister Spirit.

Film Trailers
Rodriguez was a prolific voice-over artist for film advertising. He is particularly famous for his eerie narration for trailers and TV spots for the film Jaws (1975), as well as the opening narration for Michael Jackson’s science fiction musical Captain EO (1986) for Disney theme parks. Rodriguez also provided narration for the Jaws sequels Jaws 2 (1978), Jaws 3-D (1983), and Jaws the Revenge (1987); his final appearance was in the documentary The Shark is Still Working, where he spoke of his narration of the trailer for the film Jaws; he also provided the narration for the documentary's trailer.

Rodriguez also narrated the very first teaser trailer for Alien (1979) and the trailer for the "Special Edition" release of the Star Wars Trilogy in 1997. Of the many film trailers Rodriguez narrated over several decades, notable titles include The Exorcist (1973), Shivers (1975), Taxi Driver (1976), The Omen (1976), Close Encounters of the Third Kind (1977), The China Syndrome (1979), The Black Hole (1979), 1941 (1979), Monty Python's Life of Brian (1979), The Amityville Horror (1979), Psycho II (1983), Videodrome (1983), Monty Python's The Meaning of Life (1983), Children of the Corn (1984), Brazil (1985), Ferris Bueller's Day Off (1986), Spaceballs (1987), Planes, Trains & Automobiles (1987), Dead Ringers (1988), Coming to America (1988), Scrooged (1988), A Fish Called Wanda (1988), Poltergeist III (1988), Pet Sematary (1989), Bill & Ted's Excellent Adventure (1989), National Lampoon's Christmas Vacation (1989), Gremlins 2: The New Batch (1990), Jetsons:The Movie (1990), Alien 3 (1992), Buffy the Vampire Slayer (1992), and Wayne's World (1992).

 Legacy 
Rodriguez played numerous roles, including detectives, lawyers, politicians, ambassadors, and doctors. According to Robert J. Thompson, "Television didn't have its equivalent of Jackie Robinson – there wasn't that one moment when the race barrier was broken. But Rodriguez was one of a very small group of actors who were in a relatively quiet way beginning to get these roles that television was very reluctant in the 1960s to give to black actors."

Rodriguez was seen as a symbol of intelligence, moral strength and leadership during his various roles in the 1960s and 1970s. His upsurge in Hollywood’s stature was due to a few of his earlier Broadway appearances. Rodriguez is well known for helping to break the racial barriers on television. He is a well distinguished-looking actor and went on to become a voice of great distinction behind the camera.

 Personal life 
Rodriguez had a daughter, Hollis, and a son, Gerald, with his first wife, Alameda. Following Alameda's death, he married Karen Cook in 2003. On September 6, 2007, the actor died of kidney disease at his Indio, California home, aged 89.

Television workA Carol for Another Christmas (1964)The Man from U.N.C.L.E. episode "The My Friend the Gorilla Affair" (1966) as President KhufuThe Wild Wild West (1966) episode "The Night of the Poisonous Posey" as BrutusMission: Impossible four episodes (1966–1970)Star Trek episode "Court Martial" (1967) as Commodore StoneThe Fugitive episode "Passage To Helena" Sheriff Dalton (1967)Mannix (1967) episode "A Catalogue of Sins" as Roy BradleyPeyton Place (1968–1969) as Dr. Harry MilesAdventures in Rainbow Country episode "The Boy Who Loved Animals" (1969)Then Came Bronson episode "Two Percent of Nothing" (1969)The Silent Force as Jason Hart (series regular, 15 episodes) (1970-1971)Somerset as The Lieutenant (1971)Cannon (1972) episode "A Flight of Hawks" The Starlost episode "Circuit of Death" as Sakharov Richards (1973)Genesis II (1973) as Primus KimbridgePlanet of the Apes episode "The Tyrant" (1974) as AboroGood Times episode "Florida's Rich Cousin" (1975) as Cousin EdgarThe Lives of Jenny Dolan (1975) as Dr. MallenArthur Hailey's the Moneychangers (1976) as Nolan WainwrightThe Jeffersons episode "Louise's New Interest" (1977) as Dr. Bob JessupRoots: The Next Generations (1979) as Boyd MoffattSanford (1980) as WinstonBenson (1982–1985) as Judge HarperThe Atlanta Child Murders (1985) as Maynard JacksonPerry Mason: The Case of the Sinister Spirit (1987)
 The Incredible Crash Dummies PSAS (1985-1999) as announcer 
T.J. Hooker episode "Lady In Blue" (1983) as Jason
Sanford and Son episode " The Olympics" (1975) as Lou Turner
What's Happening!! episode "Mama, The School Girl" (1977) as Todd

Filmography
Trouble-Maker (Trouble fête) (1964) as Le policier noir
The Plainsman (1966) as Brother John
The Sweet Ride (1968) as Lt. Harvey Atkins
The Heart Is a Lonely Hunter (1968) as Dr. Benedict Copeland
Come Back, Charleston Blue (1972) as Bryce
The Legend of Hillbilly John (1972) as Capt. Lojoie H. Desplain IV
Rhinoceros (1974) as Mr. Nicholson
Hugo the Hippo (1975) as Jorma's father (voice)
The Astral Factor (1978) as Captain Wells
Galaxina (1980) as Ordric (voice)
Heavy Metal (1981) as Loc-Nar (voice, uncredited)
Deadly Blessing (1981) as Narrator (voice)
BrainWaves (1982) as Dr. Robinson
Captain EO (1986) as Narrator
The Shark Is Still Working (2006) (documentary)

References

External links
Obituary in The Times (London), 3 October 2007 (Registration Required)

1918 births
2007 deaths
20th-century Canadian male actors
Anglophone Quebec people
Black Canadian male actors
Canadian male film actors
Canadian male stage actors
Canadian male television actors
Canadian male voice actors
Canadian people of Portuguese descent
Deaths from kidney failure
Male actors from Montreal
People from Indio, California
Canadian expatriate male actors in the United States